Princeton is a city in Collin County, Texas, United States. As of the 2010 census it had a population of 6,807, with an increase to 17,027 in 2020.

History

In the late 1870s T. B. Wilson and his brother George began farming near the site of future Princeton. In 1881 the Missouri, Kansas and Texas Railroad Company extended its line from Greenville to McKinney, passing through land owned by the brothers. The name "Wilson's Switch" was commonly used to designate the area. When residents applied for a post office branch, however, they learned that the name Wilson was already being used. The community then submitted the name "Princeton" in honor of Prince Dowlin, a landowner and promoter of the town. This name was accepted, and a post office was established in 1888.

In 1940, a camp of 76 cabins was built west of Princeton to house up to 400 migrant workers, who came to work during the onion and cotton seasons. In February 1945, the site became a prisoner-of-war camp for German prisoners captured during the Second World War. The local farmers paid the POWs to work on their farms. This operation continued for eight months. Under a special bill, the German prisoners were contracted to work on the City Park located across from city hall. The park was built as a living memorial and shrine to those who served and died during World War II. The Community Park/WWII P.O.W. Camp is located at 500 West College Street.

Members of the Princeton Independent School District and the Princeton Lions Club have teamed up annually to hold the Princeton Onion Festival. It is a major festival for the town that began in 2005 and is expected to occur on the fourth Saturday of April each year.

Geography
Princeton is located just east of the center of Collin County. It is bordered to the west by Lowry Crossing. U.S. Route 380 passes through Princeton, leading west  to McKinney, the county seat, and east  to Farmersville.

Nearby places 
The figure below shows nearby places in a radius of 10 miles around Princeton.

Boundary History
On June 30, 2011, a Collin County District Court Judge issued a judgment ending a legal dispute over Princeton's southern boundary. The judgment ruled against the city, finding that the tract of land in question had not been annexed and was not lawfully within the city limits. 
The case was filed on January 12, 2010 and was titled: The State of Texas Ex Rel. Collin County, Texas vs. The City of Princeton, Texas, Case No. 401-00108-2010. This case is available for public viewing in the Collin County courthouse.  
 
The State of Texas' Motion for Summary Judgement stated "that Princeton administration had 'unlawfully and improperly attempted to assert jurisdiction over a tract of land which the city never annexed and which is not lawfully within the corporate city limits,' according to Collin County court records."" "Tract Five, the property in question, is a strip of land that runs the length of the right of way of Farm to Market Road 982 from about a half mile south of U.S. Highway 380 to its intersection with FM Road 546." "The southern portion of this tract was incorporated as part of the city of Branch from August of 1971 through April of 1977." 
"After three months in which no response of any kind was received from the city (of Princeton) in regard to the matter, the (approximately 100) landowners concluded that the city (of Princeton) was ignoring (them) and decided in November (of 2006) to refer the matter to the Collin County District Attorney for possible legal action." The landowners "provided all of the documentation" (to the D.A.)...

"The state's quo warranto motion, filed in November 2010, claimed that Princeton was wrongfully exercising powers not authorized by any law or statute and that a judgment on the case could be made without a trial and instead based solely on Princeton city records."   "Princeton officials first claimed the 5.5-mile strip of land as part of the city limits in 2003, but according to the state's motion, the 'contorted history of Tract Five and the City's current efforts to effectively annex by stealth began in 1971.'"   "In January 1971, the city enacted Ordinance No. 104, through which Princeton attempted to annex certain right-of-ways surrounding the city by a process commonly referred to as 'strip annexation.'"   "Princeton City Council passed a motion to annex five tracts, but in April of that year, the council passed another motion to eliminate Tract Five from the proposed annexations." "Texas Legislature subsequently prohibited 'strip annexation' through procedures mandated by Chapter 43 of the Texas Local Government Code." "All area maps, including one Princeton filed in 2000 with the U.S. Dept. of Justice, show that Tract Five did not belong to Princeton." "Included in the state's original filing on the case in 2010 is a corporate map of Branch that was legally filed in Collin County records in March 1975, showing that Branch owns (sic) the corner of FM 982 and FM 546 and part of the same land Princeton began claiming as its own in 2003."   "Robert Davis, specially deputized District Attorney representing the state, said in the state's motion for summary judgment that 'in 2003, realizing that they were prohibited by law from engaging in the type of strip annexation which was accomplished by Ordinance No. 104, the City passed an ordinance which attempted to refute the fact

Using only Princeton's official city records, District Court Judge Ray Wheless ruled: "that Princeton's southern most corporate city limit officially extends to approximately 0.6 miles south of the intersection of F.M. Road 982 with U.S. Highway 380 but does NOT include the 5.5-mile stretch to FM 546."  "The order brings Princeton's south boundary back to where it stood for nearly 32 years."  Princeton's City Council minutes from July 11, 2011 state that "Councilmember Beauchamp made a motion to not appeal the Quo Warranto, Case No. 401-00108-2010. Councilmember Glass seconded the motion. The motion carried unanimously."  This decision was reported in The Princeton Herald on July 14, 2011 by Jamie Engle under the title, "City manager terminated, no appeal in 982 case."

Demographics

As of the 2020 United States census, there were 17,027 people, 4,069 households, and 3,351 families residing in the city.

Government
Princeton is Home Rule City.

City is governed by City Council. The city also has Community Development Corporation and Economic Development Corporation.

History of Government
Historically, Princeton was a Type A General Law city, but its council members have tried to get a Home Rule form of government passed four times: in November 2007, May 2008, November 2008, and May 2014.  Princeton voters rejected Home Rule each time: 149 to 117 in November 2007, 239 to 165 in May 2008, 979 to 449 in November 2008, and 260 to 151 in May 2014.  Home Rule cities can tax property at a higher rate than General Law cities, because the tax rate ceiling of Home Rule cities is $2.50 per $100 valuation, while the tax rate ceiling of General Law cities is  $1.50 per $100 valuation. Home Rule cities can assess additional property taxes, while a General Law city has "no inherent power to tax."  Besides additional property taxes, Home Rule cities are allowed to tax almost anything specified in its charter, while General Law cities cannot, because they have no charter.

In Jan. 2015, a year long transparency study of 113 area cities, counties, and school districts was completed by The Dallas Morning News.  Seven reporters sent out and tracked 565 open record requests for public information from 113 entities.  They asked for public information that was clearly allowed by law.  They also tested government websites to see if they were user-friendly for citizen inspection.  Grades ranged from A to F.  Princeton was among only three cities which earned an F.  By contrast, twenty-four neighboring cities earned an A.  If a government did poorly on this survey, it is a cause for citizen concern, because responding to open records requests is a basic function of government.  Cities were graded according to their responses.  The City of "Princeton was among the worst in the Transparency 2015 ratings. It ranked as bad in request best practices, bad in request compliance, good in web customer service and excellent in online meeting notice."

On Nov. 8, 2022, Princeton brought the Home Rule issue before its voters for the fifth time since 2007. This time, most of the administrators, who had been in favor of a ten square mile land grab that violated Texas law during the years of 2003 to 2011, were no longer in office. More Princeton voters turned out for this election than ever before with a total of 4,065 votes cast. The final tally was put online by the Collin County Elections Office on Nov. 18, 2022. Home Rule passed by a vote of 2,266 FOR (~56%) and 1,799 (~44%) AGAINST. The final tally can be found on the Collin County website under the title, "November 8, 2022 General and Special Election Combined Accumulated Totals.pdf (38 pages)."  It is good that so many Princeton voters are paying attention to the decisions of their city government.

Finances

History of Finances
A Fitch business report for Princeton, dated October 9, 2012 is titled: "Fitch Affirms Princeton, Texas GOs and COs  at 'A−'; Outlook Negative."  The key rating drivers for the negative outlook are Princeton's diminished reserves, increased tax rates, slowed tax base growth, above average debt, and the city's inability to replenish unrestricted general fund balances to levels that provide adequate operating flexibility and financial cushion.  The negative outlook reflects the trend of operating deficits in recent years, culminating in a negative general fund balance at the close of fiscal 2011.  The fiscal 2011 net deficit was $4.2 million.  The fiscal 2013 budget includes an increased ad valorem tax rate to increase funding for maintenance and operations; increased water service rates are also included in the budget.  Fitch notes the city's ad valorem tax rate is above average for Texas municipalities.  Overall debt is above average at 5.2% of market value despite state support for overlapping school district debt and support for direct city debt by the utility system.  GO debt amortization remains below average with 36.8% of principal scheduled for repayment within 10 years. A newer Fitch report, dated August 27, 2013, shows Princeton's business outlook improved from "Negative" to "Stable."

Education
The city is served by Princeton Independent School District.

References

Dallas–Fort Worth metroplex
Cities in Collin County, Texas
Cities in Texas
Populated places established in 1881
1881 establishments in Texas